Rio Grande Romance is a 1936 American film directed by Robert F. Hill

It was one of the few non-Westerns from Sam Katzman's Victory Studios.

It was also known as Put on the Spot.

Cast
Eddie Nugent as Bob Andrews
Maxine Doyle as Joan Williams
Fuzzy Knight as Elmer
Lucille Lund as Rose Carter
Don Alvarado as Jack Carter
Nick Stuart as George Bates
George Walsh as Joe Bradley
Joyce Kay as Patricia Carter
George Cleveland as Sheriff Williams
Forrest Taylor as Richard Shelby
Ernie Adams as Oscar Lampson
Ed Cassidy as Jailer Lewis

References

External links
Rio Grande Romance at TCMDB
Rio Grande Romance at BFI
Rio Grande Romance at IMDb
Review of film (as Put on the Spot) at Variety 

1936 films
1930s English-language films
Victory Pictures films
Films directed by Robert F. Hill
American romantic comedy films
1936 romantic comedy films
American black-and-white films
1930s American films